The 2011 I-League 2nd Division is the fourth season of the second division of the I-League, the Indian professional football league. A total of 21 teams were divided into three groups and top two teams from each group played in final round, they will be joined by Shillong Lajong FC and Sporting Clube de Goa.

Schedules and Groups
The Second Division League fixtures for the preliminary round were as follows. Group A matches were scheduled to be played from 27 March to 9 April, while Group B Matches would be held from 2 April to 18 April and Group C matches would be played from 31 March to 17 April.

Group A

Stadiums and locations

Venue: Indira Gandhi Athletic Stadium, Assam, (Guwahati)

Group table

Group B

Stadiums and locations

Venue: Jharkhand, Jamshedpur

Group table

Group C

Stadiums and locations

Venue: Tamil Nadu (Madurai)

Top scorers

Top scorers

Standings

References

I-League 2nd Division seasons
2
India